One, Inc., or One Incorporated, was one of the first gay rights organizations in the United States, founded in 1952.

Organization
The idea for an organization dedicated to homosexuals emerged from a Mattachine Society discussion meeting held on October 15, 1952. ONE Inc.'s  Articles of Incorporation were signed by Antonio "Tony" Reyes, Martin Block, and Dale Jennings on November 15, 1952. Other founders were Merton Bird, W. Dorr Legg, Don Slater, Chuck Rowland, and Harry Hay, “all of whom sought to unify homosexuals into social action.” Jennings and Rowland were also Mattachine Society founders. The name was derived from an aphorism of Victorian writer Thomas Carlyle: "A mystic bond of brotherhood makes all men one." The name was also a nod to referring to a gay person as "one of us". ONE was  the first LGBT organization in the United States to have its own office, and as such its offices acted as a prototype LGBT community center.

One, Inc. readily admitted women, including—with their pseudonyms—Joan Corbin (as Eve Elloree), Irma Wolf (as Ann Carrl Reid), Stella Rush (as Sten Russell), Helen Sandoz (as Helen Sanders), and Betty Perdue (as Geraldine Jackson). They were vital to its early success. ONE and Mattachine in turn provided vital help to the Daughters of Bilitis in the launching of their newsletter The Ladder in 1956. The Daughters of Bilitis was the counterpart lesbian organization to the Mattachine Society, and the organizations worked together on some campaigns and ran lecture series. Bilitis came under attack in the early 1970s for "siding" with Mattachine and ONE, rather than with the new separatist feminists.

ONE magazine
In January 1953 One, Inc. began publishing a monthly magazine called One, the first U.S. pro-gay publication, which it sold openly on the streets of Los Angeles for 25 cents. In October 1954, the U.S. Post Office Department declared the magazine "obscene" and refused to deliver it. ONE, Inc. brought a lawsuit in federal court, which it won in 1958, when the U.S. Supreme Court reversed the lower court ruling in One, Inc. v. Olesen based on its recent landmark First Amendment case, Roth v. United States. The magazine ceased publication in December 1969.

Season 4, episode 5 of the podcast Making Gay History is about W. Dorr Legg, Jim Kepner, and Martin Block, all of whom worked for the magazine.

ONE Institute of Homophile Studies
In 1956, ONE established the ONE Institute of Homophile Studies which, in addition to organizing classes and annual conferences, also published the ONE Institute Quarterly, a journal dedicated to the academic exploration of homosexuality.

Later history
In 1965, One separated over irreconcilable differences between ONE's business manager Dorr Legg and One magazine editor Don Slater. After a two-year court battle, Dorr Legg's faction retained the name "ONE, Inc." and Don Slater's faction retained most of the corporate library and archives. In 1968, Slater's group became the Homosexual Information Center or HIC, a non-profit corporation that continues to function.

In 1996, One, Inc. merged with ISHR, the Institute for the Study of Human Resources, a non-profit organization created by transgender philanthropist Reed Erickson, with ISHR being the surviving organization and ONE being the merging corporation. In 2005, the HIC donated many of its historic materials, including most of ONE Incorporated's Blanche M. Baker Memorial Library, to the Vern and Bonnie Bullough Collection on Sex and Gender, a special collection within the University Library at California State University, Northridge. In October 2010, ONE transferred its archives to the ONE National Gay & Lesbian Archives at the University of Southern California for preservation. ONE, Inc. continues to exist to organize exhibits and gather new material.

See also

 ONE National Gay & Lesbian Archives
 LGBT rights in the United States
 List of LGBT rights organizations
 Timeline of LGBT history

Notes

Further reading
 Bullough, Vern L. Before Stonewall:  Activists for Gay and Lesbian Rights in Historical Context. Harrington Park Press, 2002.
 Cain, Paul D. Leading the Parade: Conversations with America's Most Influential Lesbian and Gay Men. New York, Scarecrow Press, 2002.
 Dynes, Wayne R., ed., Encyclopedia of Homosexuality. New York and London, Garland Publishing, 1990
 Gallo, Marcia. Different Daughters: A History of the Daughters of Bilitis and the Rise of the Lesbian Rights Movement. New York, Carroll and Graf, 2006.
 Johansson, Warren & Percy, William A.  Outing:  Shattering the Conspiracy of Silence.  Harrington Park Press, 1994.
 Kepner, James. Rough News, Daring Views: 1950’s Pioneer Gay Press Journalism. Binghamton, NY: Harrington Park Press, 1998.
 Legg, W. Dorr. Homophile Studies in Theory and Practice. San Francisco: ONE Institute Press and GLB Publishers, 1999.
 Lofton, Crag M., ed. Letters to ONE: Gay and Lesbian Voices from the 1950s and 1960s. Albany, SUNY Press, 2012. .
 Murdoch, Joyce and Deb Price. Courting Justice: Gay Men and Lesbians v. the Supreme Court. New York: Basic Books, 2001.
 White, C. Todd. Pre-Gay L.A.: A Social History of the Movement for Homosexual Rights. Champagne: University of Illinois Press, 2009.

External links
 Some of the ONE National Gay & Lesbian Archives collections, including the entire print run of the magazine, have been digitized and are available online.

1950s in LGBT history
1952 establishments in California
LGBT-related magazines published in the United States
Defunct LGBT organizations in the United States
Defunct magazines published in the United States
History of LGBT civil rights in the United States
LGBT political advocacy groups in California
LGBT political advocacy groups in the United States
LGBT culture in Los Angeles
LGBT history in California
LGBT history in the United States
Magazines established in 1953
Magazines disestablished in 1969
Organizations established in 1952